Vodafone Romania S.A. is a Romanian mobile phone network operator. It launched in April 1997  as the first GSM network in Romania.

Before acquisition by Vodafone, it was known as Connex, after which it was rebranded Connex-Vodafone and in April 2006, the Connex name was dropped, the operator being simply known as Vodafone Romania, aligning itself with the global Vodafone brand.

Vodafone Romania is a wholly owned subsidiary of Vodafone Group plc, and is the seventh-largest Vodafone subsidiary in the world by number of subscribers. Vodafone became the majority stakeholder after it brought 79% of Mobifon's shares from Canadian company Telesystems International Wireless, which had been the previous majority shareholder.  Furthermore, it recently acquired 5% of Mobifon's shares from Canadian Entrepreneur Elani Grobler.

The operator is the main competitor of Orange for the 22.8 million active mobile telephony users in Romania. Connex, the ancestor of Vodafone Romania, held the largest number of subscribers, except the year 2000, until September 2004, when Orange edged ahead.

The motto of Vodafone is Trăiește fiecare clipă (rendered in English by the company as Make the most of now, a more accurate translation would be "Live every moment"). Previous mottos were: Tu faci viitorul (You create the future) and Viitorul sună bine (The future sounds good).

Brands of Vodafone

Vodafone Romania (and Connex before it) used numerous others brands. They include:

Xnet – an internet service provider, offering free unlimited dial-up for Connex mobile phone subscribers between 2000 and 2003. The brand is no longer used.
myX – Romania's first mobile portal. Also used by the company for a short-lived venture in the fashion industry. The portal has been relabeled as Vodafone Live.
myBanking – Mobile Banking service
myDomain – domain name service
homemade.ro – video sharing website

History
 1998: SMS services introduced
 1999: Xnet Internet service introduced; High Speed Circuit Switched Data (HSCSD) technology introduced; mobile phones running on Connex donated to ambulance service of Oradea (first Romanian company to do so)
 2000: WAP mobile Internet services launched
 2001: myX, Romania's first mobile portal launched; SMS services such as dating, ringtones and logos are introduced; GPRS service launched

 2002: GPRS prepaid introduced; first company in Europe to introduce World Wide Number (WWN) facilities; mobile banking introduced in cooperation with Banca Comerciala Romana (BCR).
 2003: myBanking introduced – a service in collaboration with Raiffeisen Bank, for customers to pay Connex bills and do banking automatically
 2003: Connex Meeting Call introduced.
 2005: 3G services based on W-CDMA introduced, giving way to video telephony and broadband internet via mobile phone.
 2005: In partnership with RIM, Connex launches the second BlackBerry service in Romania.
 2005: Liliana Solomon is named CEO of Connex.
 1 November 2005: The name of the operator is changed to Connex-Vodafone.
 27 April 2006: The name of the operator is changed to Vodafone Romania.
 2018: Vodafone acquires Liberty Global's Romanian operations, UPC Romania.

Radio frequency summary
The following is a list of known frequencies which Vodafone employs in Romania:

See also
 List of mobile network operators
 Communications media in Romania

References

External links
 Vodafone official site

Vodafone
Companies based in Bucharest
Mobile phone companies of Romania